The Dyad is a British professional wrestling tag team consisting of Jagger Reid and Rip Fowler, currently performing in WWE on the NXT brand. They are members of the Schism stable alongside Joe Gacy and Ava Raine. Reid and Fowler were previously known as the Grizzled Young Veterans and went by the names James Drake and Zack Gibson, respectively. They were the inaugural NXT UK Tag Team Champions, as well as being three-time Progress Tag Team Champions.

History

Progress Wrestling (2017–2019) 
In 2017, Zack Gibson and James Drake formed a villainous tag team called Grizzled Young Veterans. Grizzled Young Veterans defeated Chris Brookes and Kid Lykos of CCK to become the Progress Tag Team Champions. They successfully defended the titles against Aussie Open at Progress Chapter 59. At Chapter 61, Grizzled Young Veterans defeated Moustache Mountain to retain their championships. In 2018, Gibson took part of the Super Strong Style 16 Tournament, defeating Joey Janela in the first round and Pete Dunne by disqualification in the quarter finals before he was eliminated by Kassius Ohno in the semi-finals.

WWE

NXT UK (2018–2020) 
In January 2017, Drake participated in the WWE United Kingdom Championship Tournament to crown the inaugural WWE United Kingdom Champion, losing to Joseph Conners in the first round.

Gibson was announced for WWE's WrestleMania Axxess during Wrestlemania 34 weekend as part of a WWE United Kingdom Championship invitational where he lost to Mark Andrews in the first round. On day four of Axxess, Grizzled Young Veterans retained their Progress Tag Team championships by disqualification against Heavy Machinery. Around this time, it was revealed by Wrestling Observer that Gibson was signed to a WWE contract. Both would participate in the WWE United Kingdom Championship Tournament with the winner facing Pete Dunne for the United Kingdom Championship. Drake lost to Flash Morgan Webster in the first round but Gibson won the tournament after defeat Travis Banks in the finals and would go on to challenge Dunne, the next night in a losing effort.

In 2019, they defeated Moustache Mountain (Tyler Bate & Trent Seven) at NXT UK TakeOver: Blackpool in the finals of a tournament to become the inaugural NXT UK Tag Team Champions. After some defenses, they would lose the titles to Mark Andrews and Flash Morgan Webster at NXT UK TakeOver: Cardiff in a triple threat tag team match also involving Gallus. On September 11, Drake and Gibson unsuccessfully challenged Andrews & Webster in a rematch. They would have another title match at NXT UK Takeover: Blackpool II against the new champions Gallus, Andrews & Webster and Imperium in a ladder match where the champions retained.

In parallel to their NXT UK Tag Team Championship pursuit at NXT UK TakeOver: Blackpool II, Drake and Gibson competed in the 2020 Dusty Rhodes Tag Team Classic. They defeated Kushida and Alex Shelley in the quarterfinals and NXT Tag Team Champions Bobby Fish
and Kyle O'Reilly of The Undisputed Era in the semifinals, before losing to The BroserWeights (Matt Riddle and Pete Dunne) in the finals.

NXT (2020–present) 
On the February 19, 2020, episode of NXT, the Grizzled Young Veterans joined the NXT brand as tweeners, defeating Raul Mendoza and Joaquin Wilde before announcing their intent to take over NXT's tag team division. However the two would soon disappear from television as a result of travel issues from the COVID-19 pandemic. The two returned on the 25 November episode of NXT, attacking Ever-Rise. In early January 2021, the Grizzled Young Veterans took part in the 2021 Dusty Rhodes Tag Team Classic where they defeated Ever-Rise in the first round, the team of Kushida and Leon Ruff in the second round, and Timothy Thatcher and Tommaso Ciampa in the semi-finals, earning the opportunity to face MSK in the finals at NXT TakeOver: Vengeance Day. At the event, the Grizzled Young Veterans were defeated by MSK, once again failing to win in the tournament finals. On the 21 December episode of NXT,  they faced The Creed Brothers (Brutus Creed and Julius Creed) which ended in a no-contest when both teams got into a brawl with Kushida and Ikemen Jiro (wrestling as the tag team Jacket Time) who were on commentary as well as Josh Briggs and Brooks Jensen. In January 2022, the Grizzled Young Veterans took part in the 2022 Men's Dusty Rhodes Tag Team Classic where they defeated Chase University (Andre Chase and Bodhi Hayward) in the first round, but lost to The Creed Brothers in the semifinals. On the 19 April episode of NXT, the Grizzled Young Veterans had their team name, as well as their individual first names, dropped, and were just being known as "Drake and Gibson". That same episode, they lost to Legado Del Fantasma (Cruz Del Toro and Joaquin Wilde). In a WWE digital exclusive video posted later that night, they stated that they have scrapped the Gibson and Drake monikers. This was done because at that time, then-WWE Chairman and Chief Executive Officer Vince McMahon did not want wrestlers to use their real names or names they have previously used on the independent scene.

On 19 July episode of NXT, Joe Gacy's masked allies were revealed to have been James Drake and Zack Gibson, now under the ring names Jagger Reid and Rip Fowler, officially renaming the tag team "The Dyad" and turning heel once again. Gacy and the Dyad subsequently named their group "Schism". Schism gained an additional member on the 25 October episode of NXT, which was revealed to be Ava Raine. On the 27 December episode of NXT, Schism (Gacy, Fowler, and Reid) defeated Odyssey Jones, Edris Enofe, and Malik Blade.

Championships and accomplishments 

 Progress Wrestling
 Progress Tag Team Championship (3 times)
 Pro Wrestling Chaos
 King of Chaos Championship (1 time) – Drake
Pro Wrestling Illustrated
PWI ranked Drake #205 of the top 500 singles wrestlers in the PWI 500 in 2019
PWI ranked Gibson #207 of the top 500 singles wrestlers in the PWI 500 in 2019
 WWE
NXT UK Tag Team Championship Tournament (2019)
 NXT UK Tag Team Championship (1 time, inaugural)
United Kingdom Championship Tournament (2018) – Gibson

References

External links 
 
 

WWE teams and stables
WWE NXT teams and stables
Independent promotions teams and stables